Meir Tapiro, born March 28, 1975) is a former Israeli professional basketball player, and current CEO of Ironi Nes Ziona. Tapiro played at the point guard position. He was the 2002 Israeli Basketball Premier League MVP. He was a five-time Israeli Premier League Assists Leader, in 1998, 2004, 2006, 2010, and 2014.

He is of a Tunisian-Jewish descent.

Early years
Tapiro started playing basketball with the youth department of Elitzur Kiryat Ata.

Professional career
Tapiro started his professional career at Maccabi Kiryat Motzkin. During his pro club career, Tapiro also played with Hapoel Tel Aviv, Hapoel Eilat, Hapoel Jerusalem, Bnei HaSharon, Nancy, Maccabi Rishon LeZion, and Maccabi Ashdod. He was the 2002 Israeli Basketball Premier League MVP. He was a five-time Israeli Premier League Assists Leader, in 1998, 2004, 2006, 2010, and 2014.

Triple doubles
Tapiro was the first Israeli player to achieve a Triple-double in the Israeli Super League. It happened during a game on February 1, 1999, when he finished the game with 16 points, 12 rebounds, and 10 assists, while playing with Maccabi Haifa. Tapiro was also the first Israeli player to achieve a triple-double in a European-wide game, as he led Hapoel Jerusalem to a 118–95 win over BC Odessa, in a EuroCup Challenge game in 2003. In total, Tapiro had 6 triple doubles throughout his career.

Israeli national team
Tapiro also played with the senior Israeli National Team in every EuroBasket, from 1999 to 2007. He played at the EuroBasket 1999, the EuroBasket 2001, the EuroBasket 2003, the EuroBasket 2005, and the EuroBasket 2007.
His best performance in a EuroBasket event was at EuroBasket 2001, where he averaged 13.3 points, 4.8 rebounds, and 3.5 assists per game.

On May 27, 2009, at the age of 34, Tapiro announced his immediate retirement from the Israeli national team, even though he was due to participate in the upcoming EuroBasket 2009. He cited his reasons for retirement from the national team as, his need to get rest, and to prepare himself physically and mentally for the next upcoming season.

Honours
Israeli State Cup
Winner: 2006–07

Regular season Statistics
The blocks have counted since 2001-02 season  
The minutes have counted since 1997-98 season

|-
| style="text-align:left;"| 
| style="text-align:left;"| H.T.A
| 16 || ? || ? || .56 || .33 || .64 || 1.7 || 1.9 || .0 || 0 || 6.3
|-
| style="text-align:left;"| 
| style="text-align:left;"| H.T.A
| 20 || ? || ? || .52 || .38 || .81 || 2.2 || 2.8 || 0 || 0 || 14.0
|-
| style="text-align:left;"| 
| style="text-align:left;"| Eilat
| 20 || ? || ? || .51 || .36 || .85 || 2.2 || 1.6 || 0 || 0 || 9.3
|-
| style="text-align:left;"| 
| style="text-align:left;"| Eilat
| 21 || ? || ? || .50 || .28 || .75 || 2.6 || .7 || 0 || 0 || 11.8
|-
| style="text-align:left;"| 
| style="text-align:left;"| Haifa
| 22 || ? || 34.7 || .48 || .34 || .73 || 5.5 || 5.4 || 0 || 0 || 14.3
|-
| style="text-align:left;"| 
| style="text-align:left;"| Haifa
| 20 || ? || 35.6 || .51 || .34 || .85 || 5.2 || 5.3 || 1.3 || 0 || 15
|-
| style="text-align:left;"| 
| style="text-align:left;"| Jerusalem
| 28 || ? || ? || .48 || .42 || .70 || 2.6 || 2.5 || 1.1 || 0 || 8.1
|-
| style="text-align:left;"| 
| style="text-align:left;"| Jerusalem
| 26 || 24 || 27.7 || .48 || .34 || .76 || 3.2 || 2.8 || 1.7 || 0 || 11.9
|-
| style="text-align:left;"| 
| style="text-align:left;"| Jerusalem
| 27 || 23 || 34.8 || .56 || .42 || .86 || 4.7 || 4.4 || 1.7 || 0 || 17.2
|-
| style="text-align:left;"| 
| style="text-align:left;"| Bnei HaSharon
| 21 || 21 || 35.1 || .46 || .38 || .73 || 4.2 || 7.3 || 1.9 || 0 || 13.5
|-
| style="text-align:left;"| 
| style="text-align:left;"| Nancy
| 33 || 18 || 24.06 || .56 || .236 || .679 || 3.51 || 5.5 || 1 || 0.15 || 9.3
|-
| style="text-align:left;"| 
| style="text-align:left;"| Jerusalem
| 30 || 6 || 27.1 || .48 || .42 || .81 || 3.9 || 5.4 || 1.5 || 0 || 10.6
|-
| style="text-align:left;"| 
| style="text-align:left;"| Jerusalem
| 27 || 26 || 27.2 || .44 || .38 || .82 || 3.1 || 4 || 1.3 || 0 || 10.9
|-
| style="text-align:left;"| 
| style="text-align:left;"| Bnei HaSharon
| 24 || 22 || 34 || .49 || .36 || .82 || 5.3 || 5.5 || 1.4 || 0 || 13.6
|-
| style="text-align:left;"| 
| style="text-align:left;"| Bnei HaSharon
| 22 || 21 || 31.9 || .48 || .35 || .71 || 4.8 || 5.6 || 1.1 || 0 || 12.4
|-
| style="text-align:left;"| 
| style="text-align:left;"| Rishon
| 22 || 9 || 28.7 || .42 || .34 || .83 || 4.6 || 6.5 || 1.2 || 0.1 || 9.6
|-
| style="text-align:left;"| 
| style="text-align:left;"| Ashdod
| 27 || 27 || 32.6 || .45 || .33 || .85 || 5.1 || 6.1 || 2.2 || 0.1 || 11.6
|-
| style="text-align:left;"| 
| style="text-align:left;"| Ashdod
| 24 || 24 || 30.8 || .45 || .22 || .87 || 4.6 || 7.4 || 1.5 || 0 || 9
|-
| style="text-align:left;"| 
| style="text-align:left;"| Jerusalem
| 26 || 4 || 20.2 || .45 || .27 || .85 || 2.6 || 3.5 || .8 || 0 || 6.2
|-
| style="text-align:left;"| 
| style="text-align:left;"| Nes Ziona
| 29 || 29 || 33.1 || .43 || .32 || .91 || 4.3 || 6.6 || 1.5 || 0 || 9.7
|-
| style="text-align:left;"| 
| style="text-align:left;"| Nes Ziona
| 26 || 19 || 25 || .50 || .37 || .75 || 3.5 || 5.2 || 1.3 || .2 || 8
|-
| style="text-align:left;"| 
| style="text-align:left;"| Kiryat Gat
| 32 || 8 || 21 || .48 || .28 || .86 || 3.6 || 4.0 || 1.0 || 0 || 6.5
|-

References

External links
Meir Tapiro at the Eurobasket 2007 site
Meir Tapiro at the Eurocup site

1975 births
Living people
Bnei HaSharon players
Hapoel Eilat basketball players
Hapoel Jerusalem B.C. players
Hapoel Tel Aviv B.C. players
Ironi Nes Ziona B.C. players
Israeli men's basketball players
Israeli Basketball Premier League players
Israeli people of Tunisian-Jewish descent
Maccabi Ashdod B.C. players
Maccabi Haifa B.C. players
Maccabi Kiryat Gat B.C. players
Maccabi Kiryat Motzkin basketball players
Maccabi Rishon LeZion basketball players
People from Kiryat Ata
Point guards
SLUC Nancy Basket players